The men's 100 metre breaststroke event at the 2012 Summer Olympics took place on 28–29 July at the London Aquatics Centre in London, United Kingdom.

Cameron van der Burgh smashed a new world record to end South Africa's medal drought for an Olympic gold in the event. He blasted out to a 27.07 split on the first length, and pulled strongly ahead of the field to touch the wall first in 58.46, slashing 0.12 seconds off the record set by Australia's Brenton Rickard in a high-tech bodysuit from the 2009 World Championships. An underwater camera footage also showed him executing three illegal butterfly kicks on the pullout. The champion later admitted that he was doing it, saying that by not doing it "you are falling behind or giving yourself a disadvantage." Rickard's teammate Christian Sprenger ripped off a sterling time of 58.93 to snatch the silver, moving him to sixth all time in the event's history. Meanwhile, U.S. swimmer Brendan Hansen ended his three-year retirement to take the bronze in 59.49.

Hungary's Dániel Gyurta finished off the podium with a fourth-place time and a national record in 59.53. Japan's defending Olympic champion Kosuke Kitajima witnessed his three-peat bid come to an end with a fifth-place time in 59.79. Rickard, the former world record holder, earned a sixth spot in 59.87, while Italy's Fabio Scozzoli (59.97) and Lithuania's Giedrius Titenis (1:00.84) closed out the field.

Earlier in the semifinals, Van der Burgh cleared a 59-second barrier for the second time in his career and the first in textile to pick up a final top seed in 58.83, erasing Kitajima's 2008 Olympic record by eight-hundredths of a second.

Records
Prior to this competition, the existing world and Olympic records were as follows.

The following records were established during the competition:

Results

Heats

Semifinals

Semifinal 1

Semifinal 2

Final

References

External links
NBC Olympics Coverage

Men's 00100 metre breaststroke
Men's events at the 2012 Summer Olympics